Papyrus 128 (in the Gregory-Aland numbering), designated by , is a copy of a small part of the New Testament in Greek. It is a papyrus manuscript of the Gospel of John, containing verses 9:3-4; 12:16-18. The manuscript paleographically has been assigned to the 6th or 7th century.

It was formerly listed as a part of Papyrus 44. Both are currently housed at the Metropolitan Museum of Art (Inv. 14. 1. 527) in New York.

Text 
John 9:3–4

John 12:12–13

John 12:16–18

See also 

 List of New Testament papyri

Further reading 
 W. E. Crum, H. G. Evelyn-White, The Monastery of Epiphanius at Thebes, Metropolitan Museum of Art, Egyptian Expedition Publications IV, (New York, 1926), pp. 120–121. (transcription and collation).
 Ellwood M. Schofield, The Papyrus Fragments of the Greek New Testament, Southern Baptist Theological Seminary, Louisville, 1936, pp. 296–301.

External links 
 Papyrus 128 at the Metropolitan Museum of Art, accession number 14.1.527
 A Transcription of John in P128 by the International Greek New Testament Project
 

New Testament papyri
6th-century biblical manuscripts
7th-century biblical manuscripts
Gospel of John papyri